The Popular Movement for the Liberation of Cabinda (MPLC) is or was a militant separatist group fighting for the independence of Cabinda from Angola. The MPLC split off from the Front for the Liberation of the Enclave of Cabinda (FLEC) in June 1979. Over the last two decades there seems to exist no evidence that the movement still exists.

References

External links 
Attacks attributed to the MPLC at the START terrorism database

African and Black nationalist organizations in Africa
Cold War in Africa
National liberation movements in Africa
Secessionist organizations
Rebel groups in Angola